In the Belly of the Brazen Bull is the fifth studio album by British indie rock band The Cribs via Wichita Recordings. It was released on 7 May 2012. The band announced the record title and track-listing on 14 February 2012.

Background

After the departure of guitarist Johnny Marr from the group was announced on 11 April 2011, the Cribs started working on writing the follow up to Ignore the Ignorant as a three-piece. They played several headlining slots at UK festivals in summer 2011, as well as a show at Le Zenith, Paris with The Strokes, and a trip to Brazil for two shows in São Paulo. In December, the band headlined the Clockenflap festival in Hong Kong, debuting material from the new album for the first time.

Recording

Recording for the album began in summer 2011 with Queen producer David Richards, at Mountain Studios, Montreux. However, the sessions were later shelved, for unspecified reasons. Instead, the majority of the LP was recorded at Tarbox Road Studios, Cassadaga with producer and engineer David Fridmann in autumn and winter 2011 and early 2012. Sessions at Electrical Audio studio, Chicago with engineer Steve Albini-produced "Chi-Town". A self-produced session at Abbey Road, London yielded the final four-song suite that closes the record. Sam Okell and Pete Hutchings engineered the Abbey Road sessions. The album was mastered at Sterling Sound, New York City by Greg Calbi.

Personnel

The Cribs
Gary Jarman – bass guitar, vocals
Ryan Jarman – guitar, vocals
Ross Jarman – percussion

Additional personnel 
Rodrigo Etguello - violin
Tristan Beck – cello
Dave Fridmann - Mellotron, Omnichord
Greg Calbi - mastering
Nick Scott - artwork, layout

Singles

Four singles were released to promote the album. The band gave away the song "Chi-Town" as a free digital download on February 14, 2012. The first official single, "Come On, Be A No One" was released on 23 April, with "Glitters Like Gold" following on 22 July. Both singles were backed with original b-sides. A collaboration with artist Martin Creed produced Work #1431, a video for "Anna".

Accolades

Charts

Track listing

References

2012 albums
The Cribs albums
Albums produced by Dave Fridmann
Albums produced by Steve Albini
Wichita Recordings albums
Albums recorded at Tarbox Road Studios